Yanchi may refer to:
 Yanchi County, a county in China's Ningsia (Ningxia) Province
 Yanji or Yanchi (延吉市), a city in Jilin Province, China
 Yanchi, Shimen (雁池乡), a township in Shimen County, Hunan, China